is an annual Japanese festival which occurs in June at Kurama-dera.

The event is based on a legend in which a giant serpent was slain. Lengths of bamboo serve as surrogates for the serpent in a re-enactment of the legend.

References

Festivals in Japan